Medak Assembly constituency is a constituency of Telangana Legislative Assembly, India. It is one of 10 constituencies in Medak district. It is part of Medak Lok Sabha constituency.

Padma Devender Reddy, the deputy Speaker of Telangana Legislative Assembly represents the constituency.

Mandals
The Assembly Constituency presently comprises the following mandals:

Members of Legislative Assebmbly 
Members of Legislative Assembly who represented Medak

Election results

Telangana Legislative Assembly election, 2014

See also
 Medak
 List of constituencies of Telangana Legislative Assembly

References

Assembly constituencies of Telangana
Medak district